John H. Kamlowsky (August 10, 1925 – July 8, 2015) was an American attorney who served as the United States Attorney for the Northern District of West Virginia from 1964 to 1969.

He died on July 8, 2015, in Montgomery, Texas at age 89.

References

1925 births
2015 deaths
United States Attorneys for the Northern District of West Virginia
West Virginia Democrats